Nikita Ustinenko (born April 22, 1995) is a Belarusian professional ice hockey player. He is currently plays for HC Shakhtyor Soligorsk of the Belarusian Extraliga (BXL). He has formerly played with top flight club, HC Dinamo Minsk of the Kontinental Hockey League (KHL) and the Belarus men's national ice hockey team.

International play
Ustinenko was named to the Belarus men's national ice hockey team for competition at the 2015 IIHF World Championship.

Career statistics

Regular season and playoffs

International

References

External links

1995 births
Living people
Belarusian ice hockey defencemen
HC Dinamo Minsk players
Sportspeople from Gomel
HC Shakhtyor Soligorsk players
HC Yugra players
Yunost Minsk players